The 1999 Individual Long Track/Grasstrack World Championship was the 29th edition of the FIM speedway Individual Long Track World Championship.

The world title was won by Gerd Riss of Germany.

Venues

Final Classification

References 

1999
Speedway competitions in France
Speedway competitions in Germany
Speedway competitions in the Netherlands
Long